The following are international rankings of Myanmar (Burma).

Demographics

Population: 24/223
Population density: 127/239
Total fertility rate: 148/223 (1.89)
Death rate: 
CIA World Factbook: 78/192
United Nations: 69/195

Economy

GDP per capita: 208/227
Nominal GDP:
International Monetary Fund (2009): 86/181
CIA World Factbook (2009): 89/190
GDP (nominal) per capita:
International Monetary Fund: 165/180
CIA World Factbook: 166/191
GDP (PPP) (2009):
International Monetary Fund: 78/180
CIA World Factbook: 83/193
GDP (PPP) per capita:
International Monetary Fund: 161/181
CIA World Factbook: 175/194
Real GDP growth rate: 82/213
External debt (2002): 123/202
Foreign exchange reserves: 93/156
Index of Economic Freedom (2010): 175/179
Economic Freedom of the World rankings (2009): 140/141
 Trade Openness by country: 119/167

Energy
Oil consumption: 119/208
Oil imports: 104/206

Environment
Environmental Performance Index (2010): 110/163
Happy Planet Index (2009): 39/143

Globalization

KOF Globalization Index (2010): 180/203
 Trade-to-GDP Ratio: 105/179

Geography

Total area: 40/231

Health
Cigarette consumption per capita (2007): 105/121
Life expectancy (2009):
CIA World Factbook: 171/223
United Nations: 148/194
HIV/AIDS adult prevalence rate: 22/160
HIV/AIDS death rate: 18/153
Undernourishment levels: 44/76
Infant mortality rate: 
CIA World Factbook: 172/224
United Nations: 158/195
WHO Total health expenditure (PPP) per capita: 189/194
Child Development Index (2000-2006): 93/137
Overall health system performance: 190/191

Military

Total number of troops: 24/172
Number of active troops per 1000 capita: 22/172
Global Peace Index (2010): 132/149

Politics and governance

Democracy Index (2018): 118/167
Failed States Index: 16/37
Reporters Without Borders Press Freedom Index (2009): 171/175
Global Press Freedom Rankings (2009): 193/195 (39/40 in Asia-Pacific)
Corruption Perceptions Index (2009): 178/180
Composite Index of National Capability (2007): 30/193
 KOF Globalisation Index: Political Dimension (2019): 139/203
 KOF Globalisation Index: Social Dimension (2019): 187/203
 KOF Globalisation Index: Economic Dimension (2019): 163/203
 KOF Globalisation Index (2019): 180/203

Society

Caux Round Table Social Achievement Capital 2009: 166/199
Education Index: 120/179
Education expenditures: 178/182
World Giving Index (2014): 1/153
Population of Buddhists: 5th in the world
Proportion of Buddhists: 3rd in the world
Human Development Index (2007): 138/182
Satisfaction with Life Index (2006): 130/178
 World Happiness Report: 131/156

Technology
Brown University Taubman Center for Public Policy e-Governance (2006): 119/198
Number of mobile phones in use: 163/222
Number of Internet users: 148/195
 Out of 967 languages, supported by Unicode, Myanmar was the last country which start using Unicode officially in 2019.

Transportation
Vehicles per capita: 121/143

References

Myanmar